Clione limacina, known as the naked sea butterfly, sea angel, and common clione, is a sea angel (pelagic sea slug) found from the surface to greater than  depth. It lives in the Arctic Ocean and cold regions of the North Atlantic Ocean. It was first described by Friderich Martens in 1676 and became the first gymnosomatous (without a shell) "pteropod" to be described.

Subspecies 
 Clione limacina australis (Bruguière, 1792)
 Clione limacina limacina (Phipps, 1774)

Distribution 
Clione limacina is found in cold waters of the Arctic Ocean and North Atlantic Ocean, ranging south at least to the Sargasso Sea. There are three other species in the genus, which formerly were included in C. limacina (either as subspecies, variants or subpopulations). These are C. elegantissima of the cold North Pacific (at least north to the Gulf of Alaska; the Beaufort Sea is inhabited by C. limacina), C. okhotensis of the Okhotsk Sea (where it overlaps with C. elegantissima), and C. antarctica of Antarctic waters.

Description 
There are two subspecies that differentiate in body length. This makes it by far the largest sea angel.

The neurobiology of this pteropod has been studied in detail.

Ecology 
Clione limacina inhabits both the epipelagic and mesopelagic regions of the water column.

Feeding habits 
Adults feed in a predator-prey relationship almost exclusively on the sea butterflies of the genus Limacina: on Limacina helicina and on Limacina retroversa. The feeding process of Clione limacina is somewhat extraordinary. The buccal ("mouth") apparatus consists of three pairs of buccal cones. These tentacles grab the shell of Limacina helicina. When the prey is in the right position, with its shell opening facing the radula of Clione limacina, it then grasps the prey with its chitinous hooks, everted from hook sacs. Then it extracts the body completely out of its shell and swallows it whole.

Adult Limacina are absent for much of the year, leaving C. limacina without access to their main food source. A study of 138 C. limacina during a period without adult Limacina found that the stomachs of 24 contained remains of amphipods and 3 contained remains of calanoids. This temporary prey change may allow them to survive in periods of starvation, although the species can survive for one year without food.

The earliest larvae stages of C. limacina feed on phytoplankton, but from the later laval stage this changes to Limacina. The development of these two species is parallel and small C. limacina feed on Limacina of a size, while large C. limacina avoid small Limacina (including its larvae).

Life cycle 
In Svalbard, the life cycle of  C. limacina appears to be at least 2 years. It is a hermaphrodite and observations suggest this is simultaneous.

Clione limacina is a prey of planktonic feeders, such as the baleen whales, which historically led to sailors naming it "whale-food".   Some fishes are also its predators. For example, the Chum Salmon, Oncorhynchus keta, is a major predator of sea angels.

References
This article incorporates CC-BY-SA-3.0 text from the reference

Further reading 
 http://www.seaslugforum.net/factsheet/cliolima accessed 5 January 2010
  Boas J. E. V. (1888). "Spolia Atlantica. Bidrag til Pteropodernes. Morfologi og Systematik samt til Kundskaben om deres geografiski Udbredelse". Det Kongelige Danske videnskabernes selskabs skrifter. København, serie 6, number 4: 1–231. Pages 162–166. Plate 7, figure 101–103.
 Abbott, R.T. (1974). American Seashells. 2nd ed. Van Nostrand Reinhold: New York, NY (USA). 663 pp
 Backeljau, T. (1986). Lijst van de recente mariene mollusken van België [List of the recent marine molluscs of Belgium]. Koninklijk Belgisch Instituut voor Natuurwetenschappen: Brussels, Belgium. 106 pp.
 Conover R. J. & Lalli C. M. (1972). "Feeding and growth in Clione limacina (Phipps), a pteropod mollusc". Journal of Experimental Marine Biology and Ecology 9(3): 279–302. .
 Falk-Petersen S., Sargent J. R., Kwasniewski S., Gulliksen B. & Millar R.-M. (2001). "Lipids and fatty acids in Clione limacina and Limacina helicina in Svalbard waters and the Arctic Ocean: trophic implications". Polar Biology 24(3): 163–170. .
 Gilmer R. W. & Lalli C. M. (1990). "Bipolar variation in Clione, a gymnosomatous pteropod". Am. Malacol. Union Bull. 8(1): 67–75.
 Gofas, S.; Le Renard, J.; Bouchet, P. (2001). Mollusca, in: Costello, M.J. et al. (Ed.) (2001). European register of marine species: a check-list of the marine species in Europe and a bibliography of guides to their identification. Collection Patrimoines Naturels, 50: pp. 180–213
 Gosliner T. (1987). Nudibranchs of southern Africa: A guide to Opisthobranch molluscs of southern Africa. Sea Challengers, Monterey. 
 Gosner, K.L. 1971. Guide to identification of marine and estuarine invertebrates: Cape Hatteras to the Bay of Fundy. John Wiley & Sons, Inc. 693 p. 
 Hermans C. O. & Satterlie R. A. (1992). "Fast-Strike Feeding Behaviour in a Pteropod Mollusk, Clione limacina Phipps". The Biological Bulletin, Marine Biological Laboratory, 182: 1–7.
 Linkletter, L.E. 1977. A checklist of marine fauna and flora of the Bay of Fundy. Huntsman Marine Laboratory, St. Andrews, N.B. 68 p.
 Morton J. E. (1958). "Observations on the gymnosomatous pteropod Clione limacina (Phipps)". Journal of the Marine Biological Association of the United Kingdom 37: 287–297.
 Muller, Y. (2004). Faune et flore du littoral du Nord, du Pas-de-Calais et de la Belgique: inventaire. [Coastal fauna and flora of the Nord, Pas-de-Calais and Belgium: inventory]. Commission Régionale de Biologie Région Nord Pas-de-Calais: France. 307 pp. 
 Thomas, M.L.H. (ed.). 1983. Marine and coastal systems of the Quoddy Region, New Brunswick. Canadian Special Publication of Fisheries and Aquatic Sciences 64. 306 p. 
 Trott, T.J. 2004. Cobscook Bay inventory: a historical checklist of marine invertebrates spanning 162 years. Northeastern Naturalist (Special Issue 2): 261–324. 
 
 Turgeon, D. D., et al. 1998. Common and scientific names of aquatic invertebrates of the United States and Canada. American Fisheries Society Special Publication 26

External links 

Clionidae
Molluscs of the Pacific Ocean
Marine molluscs of Asia
Gastropods described in 1774
Taxa named by Constantine Phipps, 2nd Baron Mulgrave